Adriano Ciocca Vasino (born July 8, 1949) is an Italian bishop in the Catholic Church. On 21 March 2012 he became Prelate of São Félix do Araguaia, Brazil.

Biography

Adriano Ciocca Vasino was born on July 8, 1949, in Borgosesia, in the Roman Catholic Diocese of Novara based in Novara, Italy.

He studied Philosophy at the Philosophical and Theological Seminary San Gaudenzio in Novara, and Theology at the Theological Seminary San Zeno, in Verona, Italy. Ordained as a priest on September 8, 1974, he was then incardinated in the Diocese of Novara.

Career 

After some years of pastoral practice in his Diocese, he flew as a Fidei donum priest in Brazil, and he was appointed to be the Bishop of Floresta by Pope John Paul II on March 3, 1999, and was consecrated on May 2, 1999.

Until 2001 he was the referent for the CNBB in the Basic ecclesial communities. On March 21, 2012, and he entered on May 13, 2012.

References

External links 
 Official page of Prelature of São Félix

1949 births
Living people
People from Borgosesia
20th-century Italian Roman Catholic bishops
Italian Roman Catholic bishops in South America
20th-century Roman Catholic bishops in Brazil
Roman Catholic bishops of Floresta
Roman Catholic bishops of São Félix